The 398th Air Expeditionary Group is a provisional United States Air Force unit assigned to the United States Air Forces in Europe. The 398 AEG may be activated or inactivated at any time.

During World War II, its predecessor unit, the 398th Bombardment Group (Heavy) was an Eighth Air Force B-17 Flying Fortress unit in England, stationed at RAF Nuthampstead. The group flew 195 combat missions, the last being on 25 April 1945.

History

World War II

The group was constituted as the 398th Bombardment Group (Heavy) on 15 February 1943, and equipped with the B-17 Flying Fortress. It was activated 1 March 1943 at Ephrata Army Air Base, Wash., with the 600th, 601st, 602d, and 603d Bombardment Squadrons. The Group assembled at Blythe Army Airfield, California, and then moved to Geiger Field, Washington, on 20 April 1943 to complete training. On 20 June 1943 moved to Rapid City Army Air Base, South Dakota, to take up Replacement Training Unit duties. Trained 326 B-17 crews from August to December 1943 but at the beginning of the New Year reverted to training for combat. Ground echelon began movement overseas on 4 April 1944. The unit moved to Camp Myles Standish, Massachusetts, on 7–12 April 1944. Personnel embarked on USS Wakefield. Sailed to Boston on 13 April, and arrived in Liverpool on 21 April 1944.

Moved to England in April 1944 and assigned to Eighth AF. The 398th BG entered combat in May 1944, and until V-E Day operated primarily against strategic objectives in Germany, attacking targets such as factories in Berlin, warehouses in Munich, marshalling yards in Saarbrücken, shipping facilities in Kiel, oil refineries in Merseburg, and aircraft plants in Münster.

The group temporarily suspended strategic missions to attack coastal defenses and enemy troops on the Cotentin Peninsula during the Invasion of Normandy in June 1944. The group struck gun positions near Eindhoven in support of the air attack on Holland in September 1944, and raided power stations, railroads, and bridges during the Battle of the Bulge, December 1944 – January 1945. The group flew missions attacking airfields to aid the Allied assault across the Rhine in March 1945.

The 398th flew its last combat mission, attacking an airfield in Pilsen, Czechoslovakia, on 25 April 1945. After V-E Day the group transported liberated prisoners from Germany to France.

From Nuthampstead, the 398th Bomb Group flew 195 combat missions. Redeployed USA in May/June 1945. The aircraft left on 21–27 May 1945. The Ground unit went to Greenock on 22 June 1945 and sailed on Queen Elizabeth arriving in New York on 29 June 1945. After 30 days R & R some personnel assembled at Drew Field, Florida, where the Group was inactivated on 1 September 1945.

Post Cold War

The 398th BG was redesignated as the 398th Operations Group and activated 1 June 1992. Reactivated in 1992 as 398th Operations Group. Assigned first to 340th Air Refueling Wing, later to 97th Air Mobility Wing as a KC-135 air refueling group. From 1 June 1992 – 31 March 1995 the 93d Air Refueling Squadron was part of the group. The 398th OG was inactivated on 31 March 1995.

During Operation Iraqi Freedom the title 398th Air Expeditionary Group was given to a collection of units and personnel operating from Naval Support Activity Souda Bay, Greece. Colonel Marcelyn A. Atwood commanded the group.

Later in 2003, the unit participated in Operation Shining Express in Liberia, a rescue operation directed by United States European Command to evacuate civilians from parts of Liberia affected by the Second Liberian Civil War. Among the groups contributions was delivering a United States Marine Corps security forces team.

Lineage
 Constituted as the 398th Bombardment Group (Heavy) on 15 February 1943<ref name=Maurer398BG>Maurer, ''Combat Squadrons, p. 284</ref>
Activated on 1 March 1943
 Redesignated 398th Bombardment Group, Heavy c. 20 August 1943
 Inactivated on 1 September 1945
 Redesignated 398th Operations Group in 1992
 Activated on 1 June 1992
 Inactivated on 31 March 1995
 Redesignated 398th Expeditionary Air Refueling Group and converted to provisional status on 5 February 2001
 Redesignated 398th Air Expeditionary Group''' on 18 March 2003
 Activated in c. 13 July 2003
 Inactivated on 8 October 2003
 Activated in 2004
 Inactivated on 17 June 2004
 Activated on 25 March 2006
 Inactivated on 8 April 2006
 Activated on 14 March 2008
 Inactivated on 30 April 2008

Air Expeditionary Service with Joint Task Force Liberia 2003; 2008. During this period the group flew the HH-60 helicopter, and Marine units attached to the group in 2003 operated the AV-8B Harrier.

Assignments

 II Bomber Command, 1 March 1943 – 4 April 1944
 1st Combat Bombardment Wing, 22 April 1944 – 22 June 1945
 III Bomber Command, 3 July - 1 September 1945
 340th Air Refueling Wing, 1 June - 1 October 1992
 97th Air Mobility Wing, 1 October 1992 – 31 March 1995
 United States Air Forces in Europe to activate or inactivate at any time after 5 February 2001
 16th Air and Space Expeditionary Task Force, circa 16 April 2003
 3d Expeditionary Air and Space Task Force, c. 13 July - 8 October 2003
 Attached to Third Air Force, 2004 - 17 June 2004
 Attached to Air Command Europe, 25 March - 8 April 2006
 323d Air Expeditionary Wing, 14 March - 30 April 2008

Components
 56th Expeditionary Rescue Squadron, c. 13 July - 8 October 2003
 93d Air Refueling Squadron, 1 June 1992 - 31 March 1995
 600th Bombardment Squadron, 1 March 1943 - 1 September 1945
 601st Bombardment Squadron, 1 March 1943 - 1 September 1945
 602d Bombardment Squadron, 1 March 1943 - 1 September 1945
 603d Bombardment Squadron, 1 March 1943 - 1 September 1945
 712th Expeditionary Air Refueling Squadron, 18 March – 30 April 2008
 772d Expeditionary Air Base Squadron, c. 13 July - 8 October 2003
 786th Expeditionary Security Forces Squadron, c. 13 July - 8 October 2003

Stations

 Ephrata Army Air Base, Washington, 1 March 1943
 Blythe Army Air Base, California, 5 April 1943
 Geiger Field, Washington, 29 April 1943
 Rapid City Army Air Base, South Dakota, 10 June 1943 – 4 April 1944
 RAF Nuthampstead (AAF-131), England, 22 April 1944 – 26 May 1945
 Drew Field, Florida, 3 July - 1 September 1945

 Altus Air Force Base, Oklahoma, 1 June 1992 – 31 March 1995
 Naval Support Activity Souda Bay, Greece, circa 16 April 2003
 Lungi International Airport, Sierra Leone, 13 July 2003 - 8 October 2003
 Dakar, Senegal 2004 - 17 June 2004
 Tunis, Tunisia, 25 March - 8 April 2006
 Budapest Ferihengy International Airport, 14 March - 30 April 2008

References

Notes

Citations

Bibliography

 
 Freeman, Roger A. (1991) The Mighty Eighth The Colour Record. Cassell & Co.

External links
"USAFE commander, CCM visit deployed troops", Maj. Scott Vadnais
Operation Shining Express
"Rain presents a challenge for Air Force crews in Liberia", Marni McEntee, Stars and Stripes European edition, 24 July 2003
"USAFE forces deliver U.S. Marines to Liberia, evacuate 23 people", Capt. Kristi Beckman, USAFE News
"Tankers deploy to Hungary, Bulgaria for Operation Noble Endeavor", Tech. Sgt. Eric Petosky, 100 ARW Public Affairs

398